Cronk may refer to:

People

Geography

Isle of Man
 "Cronk" appears in many place names and street names on the Isle of Man, meaning "hill". For example:
Cronk ny Arrey Laa, the highest hill above the rugged south-west coast of the Isle of Man
Cronk ny Merriu, one of the remains of promontory forts in the Isle of Man
Cronk Urleigh on the primary A3 road in the parish of Michael in the Isle of Man
Cronk-ny-Mona on the Snaefell Mountain Course on the primary A18 Mountain Road in the Isle of Man
a fictional station in The Railway Series

Other places
Cronk Islands, group of Antarctic islands lying northeast of Hollin Island, in the Windmill Islands

Other uses
Cronk (drink), American root beer beverage
Cronk, UK English - the hoarse call of a raven or the honk of a goose (Merriam-Webster dictionary)